Haabersti is one of the 8 administrative districts of Tallinn, the capital of Estonia.

Haabersti is divided into 12 subdistricts: Astangu, Haabersti, Kakumäe, Mustjõe, Mäeküla, Õismäe, Pikaliiva, Rocca al Mare, Tiskre, Veskimetsa, Vismeistri and Väike-Õismäe.

The most populous part of the district is Väike-Õismäe, a residential area consisting of big panel houses which were mostly built in the 1970s. Lake Harku and an extensive beach area at Kakumäe and the Kopli Bay lie within the boundaries of the district. Since most of the territory has not been previously used for building, new areas with small residential buildings have developed in the last two decades.

Haabersti is home to the Estonian Open Air Museum, Saku Suurhall, Tallinn Zoo, and Rocca al Mare Shopping Center.

Population

Haabersti has a population of 43,916.

References

External links

Districts of Tallinn